The Agawam were an Algonquian Native American people in New England encountered by English colonists who arrived in the early 17th century. Decimated by pestilence shortly before the English colonization and fearing attacks from their hereditary enemies among the Abenaki and other tribes of present-day Maine, they invited the English to settle with them on their tribal territory.

The General Court of Massachusetts protected them by colonial law, along with their land rights and their crops. The English defended them against further attacks. The Agawam had an open invitation to enter Puritan households. Often a small number would show up as dinner guests and were fed. By the time of King Philip's War in 1675, the Agawam had been assimilated. They played no part in the war.

Name
The name is an anglicization of the native name assigned to the territory of a sovereign state consisting of the tribe. The English named the tribes after their native place names; therefore it is likely that the natives did also; i.e., Agawam is an English exonym based on a native endonym.

The colonists created a number of anglicized place names from the territorial name: Agawam and Squam from asquam.  Inland the edge of the Agawam territory was considered to extend from present-day North Andover to Middleton, and from there to the Danvers River, which was the border with the Naumkeag tribe (near where Salem, Massachusetts developed).

Varieties of the English name were used also for small tribes near Springfield, Massachusetts and Wareham, Massachusetts. There is no evidence that they were connected in any way to the Essex County Agawam. The former were of the Pocomtuc and the latter of the Wampanoag peoples. The large variety of English variants indicates an origin from different endonyms, such as "the fish-curing place." These natives did participate in King Philip's War, causing some loss of life among the colonials with whom they had formerly resided in peace.

Language
All the natives of the east coast of the United States and Canada from Nova Scotia to South Carolina spoke Eastern Algonquian, a language group belonging to the Algonquian family, but separated from the rest of it by the Appalachian mountains. Eastern Algonquian included Massachusett, spoken on the coast of Massachusetts. The latter family was divided into more closely related languages, or dialects, one of which was that of the Agawam of the North Shore.

Society
Each Algonquian language marks the range of a sovereign state, or tribe, ruled by a hereditary sachem, or chief. He had additional chiefs to assist him. The basis on which the position of sachem was defined was economic. He personally was considered to own all the lands used for common food gathering and production. He distributed the use of these to groups of families under sub-chiefs at his discretion. This arrangement meant that the English could negotiate with a single sachem to gain lands, but the Native Americans had a different concept of the use of land, and may not have understood that the purchased land was being permanently removed from the commons of the tribe. The sachems reigning at the time were recorded by the English in the early 17th century and "entered history". The sachem of the Agawam was Masconomet.

See also 
 Native American tribes in Massachusetts

References

Bibliography
 

Native American tribes in Massachusetts
Indigenous languages of the North American eastern woodlands